Thekraj Secondary School was established in 2017 BS (1960-1961 AD) by social leader Thekraj Pant. It is situated in Attariya Municipality Ward no.10 Beladevipur, Kailali, Nepal. The school has had good results in SLC examination. The school began as a pre-primary but now also extends to secondary school. This school is a community school runs under governmental aid.

Secondary schools in Nepal
Buildings and structures in Kailali District
Educational institutions established in 1960
1960s establishments in Nepal